Frank William Walbank   (10 December 1909 – 23 October 2008) was a scholar of ancient history, particularly the history of Polybius. He was born in Bingley, Yorkshire, and died in Cambridge.

Walbank attended Bradford Grammar School and went on to study Classics at Peterhouse, Cambridge.

From 1951 to 1977, Walbank was Rathbone Professor of Ancient History and Classical Archaeology at the University of Liverpool. After retirement he was a professor emeritus at Liverpool and an Honorary Fellow of Peterhouse.

Walbank held visiting positions at the University of Pittsburgh, the University of California, Berkeley, and the Institute for Advanced Study in Princeton.

Walbank's published works include Aratos of Sicyon (1933), Philip V of Macedon (1940), The Awful Revolution (1946; 1969), Polybius (1972; 1990), A Historical Commentary on Polybius, 3 vols. (1957, 1967, 1979), The Hellenistic World (1981) and, with N.G.L. Hammond, A History of Macedonia, Vol. III: 336–167 BC. He also served as the joint editor of volumes 7 and 8 of the Cambridge Ancient History.

In 1933, Walbank's essay "Aratos of Sicyon" won the Cambridge University Thirlwall Prize. He was elected a foreign member of the Royal Netherlands Academy of Arts and Sciences in 1981.

References

Additional sources 
 Momigliano, Arnaldo. "F.W. Walbank", The Journal of Roman Studies, Vol. 74. (1984).

External links
Obituary by Peter Garnsey at the independent.co.uk (23 October 2008).
Obituary by Robin Seager at the guardian.co.uk (19 November 2008).
Polybius Man by Mary Beard at The Times Literary Supplement (29 May 2013).

1909 births
2008 deaths
English classical scholars
Historians of antiquity
Alumni of Peterhouse, Cambridge
Fellows of Peterhouse, Cambridge
Academics of the University of Liverpool
Commanders of the Order of the British Empire
People from Bingley
Scholars of ancient Greek history
20th-century English historians
21st-century English historians
Members of the Royal Netherlands Academy of Arts and Sciences
Presidents of The Roman Society
Presidents of the Classical Association